Mlini is a village in Croatia. It is connected by the D8 highway between Dubrovnik and Dubrovnik Airport.

Populated places in Dubrovnik-Neretva County